Tabapuã is a municipality in the state of São Paulo, Brazil. The population is 12,485 (2020 est.) in an area of 345.6 km².

Tabapuã belongs to the Mesoregion of São José do Rio Preto.

References

Municipalities in São Paulo (state)